Wendell Phillips (1811–1884) was an American abolitionist.

Wendell Phillips may also refer to:

Wendell Phillips (archaeologist) (1921–1975), American archaeologist
Wendell H. Phillips (1934–1999), American politician